Support vessel may refer to:

Military ship classes
 Auxiliary ship, designed to support warships
 Bacolod City-class logistics support vessel, a ship class in the Philippine Navy
 General Frank S. Besson-class logistics support vessel, a type of watercraft in the United States Army
 Immediate Support Vessel, a type of patrol boat in the Indian Navy
 Maneuver Support Vessel (Light), a type of landing craft in the United States Army
 Marino-class diving support vessel, a diving vessel in the Italian Navy
 Multi-Role Support Vessel (India)
 Multi-role support ship (Malaysia)

Other
 Diving support vessel, a ship that is used as a floating base for professional diving projects
 Yacht support vessel